Madhuri Braganza (born 18 June 1990) is an Indian actress, who predominantly appears in Malayalam films. She also appeared in a Kannada film.

Acting career
She was born in Bangalore, Karnataka. She debuted in the Malayalam movie Ente Mezhuthiri Athazhangal and in 2018 gained popularity through the movie Joseph. She acted in Ittymaani: Made in China along with Mohanlal.
She played a character role of a serious journalist in the Malayalam film Pattabhiraman. She is popular on social media for her active interaction with fans and critics alike. She acted in her debut Kannada film, Kushka, that was released in 2020. She also started her singing career in films in the movie Al Mallu.

Filmography

References

External links
 

Indian film actresses
Actresses in Kannada cinema
Living people
1990 births
Actresses from Karnataka
21st-century Indian actresses
Actresses in Malayalam cinema